Twomile Creek is a stream in the U.S. state of Wisconsin. It is a tributary to Nepco Lake.

Twomile Creek was so named for its distance,  from the original Grand Rapids townsite.

References

Rivers of Portage County, Wisconsin
Rivers of Wood County, Wisconsin
Rivers of Wisconsin